Euan Leslie Williams (born 15 January 2003) is a professional footballer currently playing as a midfielder for Charlton Athletic. He has represented both England and Northern Ireland at youth international level.

Club career

Charlton Athletic
Williams came through the youth ranks at Charlton Athletic and made his senior debut for the club – from the bench – in a 1–0 victory over Milton Keynes Dons in the EFL Trophy at The Valley on 4 January 2022.

On 8 July 2022, Williams signed a new two–year deal with the club, keeping him at The Valley until, at least, 2024.

Career statistics
.

Notes

References

2003 births
Living people
English footballers
England youth international footballers
Association footballers from Northern Ireland
Northern Ireland youth international footballers
Association football midfielders
Charlton Athletic F.C. players